Saliena Parish is an administrative unit of Augšdaugava Municipality in the Selonia region of Latvia.

Towns, villages and settlements of Saliena Parish 
 Saliena

References

 
Parishes of Latvia
Selonia